Hapa is a Hawaiian word for someone of multiracial ancestry. In Hawaii, the word refers to any person of mixed ethnic heritage, regardless of the specific mixture. The term is used for any multiracial person of partial East Asian, Southeast Asian, or Pacific Islander mixture in California. In what can be characterized as trans-cultural diffusion or the wave model, this latter usage has also spread to Massachusetts, Ohio, and Oregon.

Both uses are concurrent.

Historical and Hawaiian usage 
The word "hapa" entered the Hawaiian language in the early 1800s, with the arrival of Christian missionaries who instituted a Hawaiian alphabet and developed curriculum for schools. It is a transliteration of the English word "half," but quickly came to mean "part," which could be combined with numbers to form fractions. For example, hapalua is half, hapahā is one-fourth, and hapanui means majority.

In Hawaii, the term can be used in conjunction with other Hawaiian racial and ethnic descriptors to specify a particular racial or ethnic mixture. An example of this is hapa haole (part European/White).

Pukui states that the original meaning of the word haole was "foreigner." Therefore, all non-Hawaiians can be called haole. In practical terms, however, the term is used as a racial description for whites, with the specific exclusion of Portuguese. Portuguese are traditionally considered to be a separate race in Hawaii.

Hapa-haole also is the name of a type of Hawaiian music in which the tune, styling, and/or subject matter is Hawaiian, but the lyrics are partly, mostly, or entirely in English. Many hapa-haole songs had their musical roots in the Western tradition, and the lyrics were in some combination of English and Hawaiian; these songs first gained popularity outside the Territory of Hawaii beginning in 1912–1915, and include titles such as "My Little Grass Shack in Kealakekua" and "Sweet Leilani."

Hapa haole is also used for Hawaiian-language hula songs that are partly in English, thus disqualifying them as "authentic" Hawaiian hula in some venues such as the Merrie Monarch Festival.

Controversy 
Some see the use of the term to refer to mixed Asian people without any connections to Hawaii as a misappropriation of Hawaiian culture, but there are kamaāina and Kānaka Maoli who see it as hypocritical to protest anyone using what was originally taken from another culture to begin with.

Still others take a stronger stand in discouraging its usage and misuse as they consider the term to be vulgar and racist.

However, the term, unlike other words referring to mixed-race people, has never been a derogatory term when it is used in its original Hawaiian context, although there is some debate about appropriate usage outside this context. As Wei Ming Dariotis states, "'Hapa' was chosen because it was the only word we could find that did not really cause us pain. It is not any of the Asian words for mixed Asian people that contain negative connotations either literally (e.g. 'children of the dust,'  'mixed animal') or by association (Eurasian)."

In popular culture 
In 2010, a film called One Big Hapa Family was released about Japanese Canadians.

See also 

Afro-Asians
Amerasian
Eurasian
Filipino mestizo
Filipino people of Spanish ancestry
Hāfu
Hun-Xue-Er
Luk khrueng
Multiracial
Multiracialism
Race of the future
The Hapa Project
Third culture kid

Notes

References

Citations

Sources

Books

Journal articles

Articles

Videos

External links

 How the Hawaiian word 'hapa' came to be used by people of mixed heritage (audio)
 Hapa Happy Hour podcast
 online presentation about the Hapa Project

American people of Oceanian descent
Asian-American culture
Ethno-cultural designations
Hawaiian words and phrases
Multiracial affairs in the United States